The 1932 Rhode Island gubernatorial election was held on November 8, 1932. Democratic nominee Theodore F. Green defeated incumbent Republican Norman S. Case with 55.20% of the vote.

General election

Candidates
Major party candidates
Theodore F. Green, Democratic 
Norman S. Case, Republican

Other candidates
Frederick W. Hurst, Socialist
James P. Reid, Communist
Roscoe W. Phillips, Prohibition
Charles F. Bishop, Socialist Labor

Results

References

1932
Rhode Island
Gubernatorial